Charles or Chuck Morse may refer to:

 Charles Copeland Morse (1842–1900), American businessman known as the "American Seed King"
 Charles E. Morse (1841–1920), Civil War soldier and Medal of Honor recipient
 Charles W. Morse (1856–1933), New York businessman, involved in ice, shipping and banking
 Charles Morse (cricketer) (1820–1883), English cricketer
 Chuck Morse (born 1960), President of the New Hampshire Senate
 Chuck Morse (journalist), American conservative journalist
 Chuck W. Morse (born 1969), American anarchist, academic, translator, and writer
 Charles Morse Stotz (1899–1985), American architect and historical preservationist
 Charles Hosmer Morse (1828–1895), founder of Fairbanks-Morse corporation
 Charles Fessenden Morse (1839–1926), lieutenant colonel in the Union Army during the American Civil War